

Champions

Olympics
Men
 
 
 
Women

Professional
Men
2004 NBA Finals: Detroit Pistons over the Los Angeles Lakers 4-1.  MVP: Chauncey Billups
2003-04 NBA season
2004 NBA Playoffs
2004 NBA draft
2004 NBA All-Star Game
Eurobasket: None.
Euroleague:
Maccabi Tel Aviv defeated Skipper Bologna 118-74 in the final
ULEB Cup
Hapoel Migdal Jerusalem defeated Real Madrid 83-72
Women
WNBA Finals: Seattle Storm over Connecticut Sun 2-1.  MVP: Betty Lennox
2004 WNBA season
2004 WNBA Playoffs
2004 WNBA draft
2004 WNBA All-Star Game
Eurobasket Women: None.

College
Men
NCAA Division I: Connecticut 82, Georgia Tech 73
National Invitation Tournament: Michigan 62, Rutgers 55
NCAA Division II: Kennesaw State 84, Southern Indiana 59
NCAA Division III: UW-Stevens Point 84, Wiliams 82
NAIA Division I Mountain State 74, Concordia 70
NAIA Division II Oregon Tech 81, Bellevue (Neb.) 70
Women
NCAA Division I: Connecticut 70, Tennessee 61
Women's National Invitation Tournament: Creighton 73, UNLV 52
NCAA Division II: California (Pennsylvania) 75, Drury 72
NCAA Division III: Wilmington (Ohio) 59, Bowdoin 53
NAIA Division I: Southern Nazarene 77, Oklahoma City 61
NAIA Division II Morningside (Iowa) 87, Cedarville (Ohio) 74

Awards and honors

Naismith Memorial Basketball Hall of Fame
Class of 2003:
 Jerry Colangelo
 Drazen Dalipagic
 Clyde Drexler
 Bill Sharman
 Maurice Stokes
 Lynette Woodard

Women's Basketball Hall of Fame
Class of 2004
 Sylvia Hatchell
 Lurlyne Greer Rogers
 Amy Ruley
 Bev Smith
 William L. Wall
 Marian E. Washington

Professional
Men
NBA Most Valuable Player Award:   Kevin Garnett
NBA Rookie of the Year Award: LeBron James
NBA Defensive Player of the Year Award: Ron Artest
NBA Coach of the Year Award: Mike D'Antoni, Phoenix Suns
Euroscar Award: Dirk Nowitzki, Dallas Mavericks and 
Mr. Europa: Pau Gasol, Memphis Grizzlies and 
Women
WNBA Most Valuable Player Award: Lisa Leslie, Los Angeles Sparks
WNBA Defensive Player of the Year Award: Lisa Leslie, Los Angeles Sparks
WNBA Rookie of the Year Award: Diana Taurasi, Phoenix Mercury
WNBA Most Improved Player Award: Kelly Miller, Charlotte Sting & Wendy Palmer, Connecticut Sun
Kim Perrot Sportsmanship Award: Teresa Edwards, Minnesota Lynx
WNBA Coach of the Year Award: Suzie McConnell-Serio, Minnesota Lynx
WNBA Finals Most Valuable Player Award: Betty Lennox, Seattle Storm

Collegiate 
 Combined
Legends of Coaching Award: Mike Montgomery, Stanford
 Men
John R. Wooden Award: Jameer Nelson, Saint Joseph's
Naismith College Coach of the Year: Phil Martelli, Saint Joseph's
Frances Pomeroy Naismith Award: Jameer Nelson, Saint Joseph's
Associated Press College Basketball Player of the Year: Jameer Nelson, Saint Joseph's
NCAA basketball tournament Most Outstanding Player: Sean May, North Carolina
USBWA National Freshman of the Year: Luol Deng, Duke
Associated Press College Basketball Coach of the Year: Phil Martelli, Saint Joseph's
Naismith Outstanding Contribution to Basketball: George Killian
 Women
John R. Wooden Award: Alana Beard, Duke
Naismith College Player of the Year: Diana Taurasi, Connecticut
Naismith College Coach of the Year: Pat Summitt, Tennessee
Wade Trophy: Alana Beard, Duke
Frances Pomeroy Naismith Award: Erika Valek, Purdue
Associated Press Women's College Basketball Player of the Year: Alana Beard, Duke
NCAA basketball tournament Most Outstanding Player: Diana Taurasi, UConn
Basketball Academic All-America Team: Kelly Mazzante, Penn State
Carol Eckman Award: Deirdre Kane, West Chester
USBWA National Freshman of the Year: Tiffany Jackson, Texas
Associated Press College Basketball Coach of the Year: Joe Curl, Houston
List of Senior CLASS Award women's basketball winners: Alana Beard, Duke
Nancy Lieberman Award: Diana Taurasi, Connecticut
Naismith Outstanding Contribution to Basketball: Sonja Hogg

Deaths
 January 9 — Yinka Dare, Nigerian center for the New Jersey Nets (born 1972)
 January 18 — Hook Dillon, All-American at North Carolina (born 1924)
 January 26 — Stanley Nantais, Canadian Olympic player (1936) (born 1913)
 January 28 — Sox Walseth, American college coach (South Dakota State, Colorado) (born 1926)
 April 11 — Hy Gotkin, All-American at St. John's (born 1922)
 July 30 — Ed Melvin, American BAA player and college coach (St. Bonaventure, Toledo) (born 1916)
 July 24 — Cotton Fitzsimmons, NBA basketball coach (born 1931)
 August 12 — George Yardley, Hall of Fame player for the Fort Wayne Pistons (born 1928)
 September 4 — Alphonso Ford, 3000-point NCAA scorer and Greek A1 League MVP (born 1971)
 December 14 — Anselmo López, Spanish coach and administrator.  FIBA Hall of Fame member (born 1910)
 December 18 — Eddie Oram, All-American college player (USC), NBL player (born 1914)
 December 25 — Howie Williams, American AAU player and Olympic gold medalist (1952) (born 1927)

See also
 Timeline of women's basketball

References

External links